City of Eyes is an album by guitarist Ralph Towner recorded in 1988 and released on the ECM label.

Reception 
The Allmusic review by Thom Jurek awarded the album 4 stars, stating, "City of Eyes shows Ralph Towner as a musical explorer again, a composer and instrumentalist who can persuasively create aural travelogues through time, space, and terrain".

Track listing 
All compositions by Ralph Towner
 "Jamaica Stopover" - 4:11   
 "Cascades' - 6:47   
 "Les Douzilles" - 6:10   
 "City of Eyes" - 4:11   
 "Sipping the Past"  2:31   
 "Far Cry" - 4:23   
 "Janet" - 3:21   
 "Sustained Release" - 5:03   
 "Tundra" - 4:40   
 "Blue Gown" - 5:36

Personnel 
 Ralph Towner — twelve-string guitar, classical guitar, piano, synthesizer
 Markus Stockhausen — trumpet, piccolo trumpet, fluegelhorn
 Paul McCandless — oboe, English horn
 Gary Peacock — bass
 Jerry Granelli — drums, electronic drums

References 

ECM Records albums
Ralph Towner albums
1989 albums
Albums produced by Manfred Eicher